Sovereign Assurance Company Limited (branded as Sovereign) was a New Zealand-based financial services company that provided life and health insurance, home loans, investment and superannuation products. It was a member of the AIA Group of companies.

History
Sovereign started out in 1989 as a life insurance and investment provider. The company expanded in 1996 with its acquisition of Metropolitan Life Assurance Company of N.Z. Limited.

In 1998 Sovereign was acquired by the ASB Group, which is owned by the CBA.  When CBA merged with Colonial Limited in 2000, the Colonial New Zealand life and investment business was integrated with Sovereign, making it the largest life insurer in New Zealand.

Sovereign has maintained a market share of around 29% to 30% of in-force premiums over the five years up to 2011.

Sovereign currently has a financial strength rating of A+ (Superior) from international rating agency A.M. Best (awarded December, 2011).

Sovereign is one of over 900 signatories for the Principles for Responsible Investment (PRI).  The initiative was designed and developed by the United Nations Environment Program Finance Initiative (UNEP FI), and is a set of aspirational and voluntary guidelines for investment entities wishing to address environmental, social, and corporate governance (ESG) issues.

In 2011, Sovereign hosted a United Nations-facilitated ‘Principles for Sustainable Insurance’ Regional Consultation Meeting for Oceania, which will help develop new sustainability principles for the global insurance sector.

On 21 September 2017 CBA announced that it had agreed to sell Sovereign, as well as its Australian insurance business (CommInsure) to AIA Group for AUD $3.8 billion. This sale was successfully completed on 2 July 2018.

AIA New Zealand and Sovereign continued to operate as two separate brands until 5 August 2019. From this date onwards the combined business has traded as AIA New Zealand Limited.

References 

Financial services companies established in 1989
Insurance companies of New Zealand
Financial services companies of New Zealand